2010–11 Eerste Klasse was a Dutch association football season of the Eerste Klasse.

Saturday champions were:

A: VV DOVO
B: Sportlust '46
C: Achilles Veen
D: VV Bennekom
E: SV Urk

Sunday champions were:
A: Koninklijke HFC
B: RKAVV
C: RKSV Nuenen
D: RKSV Groene Ster
E: Longa '30
F: DIO Groningen

Eerste Klasse seasons
5